Simone Rossi (born October 1968) is an Italian businessman, and the CEO of EDF Energy, having succeeded Vincent de Rivaz in November 2017.

Simone Rossi was born in October 1968. He has a degree in Business Administration from Bocconi University, Milan, and a degree in clarinet from Istituto Puccini, Gallarate.

Rossi has worked for EDF since 2004. Prior to his appointment as CEO, Rossi was head of EDF Group's international division since 2015, and a former EDF Energy's chief financial officer.
Rossi is married, with two daughters.

References

External links

Italian businesspeople
Living people
1968 births